The men's 1500 metres event at the 1975 Pan American Games was held in Mexico City on 18 and 20 October.

Medalists

Results

Heats

Final

References

Athletics at the 1975 Pan American Games
1975